Echo City Hall is an historic building in Echo, Oregon, United States. The building is listed on the National Register of Historic Places.

See also
 National Register of Historic Places listings in Umatilla County, Oregon

References

City halls in Oregon
Echo, Oregon
National Register of Historic Places in Umatilla County, Oregon
Buildings and structures completed in 1916